The San Francisco Transbay Terminal was a transportation complex in San Francisco, California, United States, roughly in the center of the rectangle bounded north–south by Mission Street and Howard Street, and east–west by Beale Street and 2nd Street in the South of Market area of the city. It opened on January 14, 1939 as a train station and was converted into a bus depot in 1959. The terminal mainly served San Francisco's downtown and Financial District, as transportation from surrounding communities of the Bay Area terminated there such as: Golden Gate Transit buses from Marin County, AC Transit buses from the East Bay, and SamTrans buses from San Mateo County. Long-distance buses from beyond the Bay Area such as Greyhound and Amtrak also served the terminal. Several bus lines of the San Francisco Municipal Railway connected with the terminal.

It closed on August 7, 2010, to make way for the construction of the replacement facility, the Transbay Transit Center, and associated towers. All long-distance and transbay bus operations were transferred to a Temporary Transbay Terminal at the nearby block bounded by Main, Folsom, Beale, and Howard Streets.

The new Transbay Transit Center broke ground on August 11, 2010. US Secretary of Transportation Ray LaHood, US Speaker of the House Nancy Pelosi, and the Mayor of San Francisco Gavin Newsom attended the ceremony. The new transit center opened to the public on August 12, 2018.

Bridge railway

The Transbay Terminal served as the San Francisco terminus for the electric commuter trains of the Interurban Electric (Southern Pacific), the Key System and the Sacramento Northern (Western Pacific) railroads, which ran on the south side of the lower deck of the Bay Bridge. Bus services such as Greyhound and local Muni streetcar lines had stops at the main entrance.

History
The Terminal was designed by Timothy L. Pflueger in the Art Moderne style.
Bids were taken for construction of the terminal in June 1937, excavation began on 29 July 1937, and the first steel was erected on 12 January 1938. Structural concrete was complete by May 1938. State Director of Public Works Frank W. Clark turned the facilities over to the State of California, as represented by Lieutenant Governor Ellis E. Patterson, who turned over management of the facility to the three electric railroad companies. State officials and guests rode electric trains to the opening ceremony.

Construction of rail facilities (including laying tracks on the bridge and construction of the new San Francisco terminal) for the Bay Bridge had cost the state an estimated , and the state had invested an additional  in rolling stock, which was leased to the railroad companies.

Train service
Governor Frank Merriam piloted the first (ceremonial) electric train across the bridge on September 23, 1938, although regular service did not commence until January 1939, after the terminal was complete. Trains were controlled with a custom electric switchboard, which was considerably simpler than the typical mechanical lever system then in use. A loop was built so trains could turn around and go back across the bridge. Even after rail service ended, the loop continued to be used by AC Transit, Thruway Motorcoach and Greyhound buses until the station closed. Surprisingly, a track was never made to connect to the Southern Pacific's Third and Townsend Depot so trains could go further south. There were six tracks. Beginning on January 15, 1939, half of all Market Street Railway trains were rerouted to a loop in front of the building; all services were eventually rerouted here in 1941.

By November 1940, the Interurban Electric Company was seeking permission to abandon East Bay service, prompting Director Clark to consider proposals for the state to assume operation of trains across the bridge. The SP and Sacramento Northern trains ceased service across the Bay in 1941 only two years after the Terminal was completed. Interurban stated they were forced to discontinue service, citing falling passenger counts, revenues, and a failed proposed consolidation with the Key System. After Interurban was granted permission to discontinue service, Sacramento Northern also applied to discontinue service in 1941. Sacramento Northern carried only a minuscule fraction (less than 1%) of the total rail traffic over the Bay Bridge, which meant Sacramento Northern likely also operated at a loss. Trains carried 37.334 million passengers across the Bay Bridge at peak ridership in 1945, driven in part by gasoline rationing, but ridership declined precipitously, managing to move only 6.113 million passengers in 1957. The Key System successfully petitioned the Public Utilities Commission to discontinue service across the Bay Bridge in 1955 due to falling revenues, after failing to discontinue service in an unsuccessful 1953 petition. The Oakland City Planning Commission reported that since 1945, all the petitions from the Key System had invariably asked for cuts to service and increased fares, which also contributed to declining ridership. There have been several attempts to restore rail service across the bridge (though not necessarily into the Transbay Terminal), but none have been successful.

Rebuilt for bus service
During the next year, the Transbay Terminal was rebuilt into a bus depot. The tracks were removed and replaced with pavement for use primarily by the buses of the publicly owned successor of the Key System, AC Transit. All lines were operating from the rebuilt terminal by July 12, 1959, and Greyhound service was added on February 1, 1960. In 1971 Amtrak started running buses into the Transbay Terminal from the Southern Pacific's 16th Street Station. Bus service thrived until late 1974, when BART's Transbay Tube opened. Many people preferred BART over AC Transit. The tube didn't run through the terminal, resulting in its decline. Homeless people noticed the dropping commuters and took the chance to inhabit it.

After formation of the Muni Metro, streetcars were replaced with light rail vehicles and rerouted through the upper level of the Market Street Subway. Rail service to the station was briefly revived by the F Market line, at first during historic streetcar festivals, but for full service by 1995. The line's extension to Fisherman's Wharf in March 2000 saw the end of rail traffic to the terminal. The last F-line trip departed from the Transbay Terminal at 12:55 a.m. on the night of March 3, and the track was abandoned in August 2000, the final use being a "farewell" trip by 1916-built work car C1 on August 18, with work on removal of the track on Fremont Street beginning soon afterwards.

The Transbay Terminal hosted a cocktail lounge, a diner, a newsstand, and a state police office until the 1990s, when the tenants were either evicted or unable to meet safety regulations. Because the Terminal straddled First and Fremont streets, the large overpass structures and lobby spaces unofficially served to shelter numerous homeless people. Even after demolition commenced, several Transbay Terminal residents refused to move, preferring instead to sleep next to demolition debris.

Environmental issues
On January 30, 1986, four underground storage fuel tanks were excavated and removed from the 150 First Street site. Each of these tanks had a capacity of 1,000 gallons (Earth Metrics, 1989). Eight soil samples showed the existence of total petroleum hydrocarbons in levels ranging from 20 to 9,000 parts per million. On February 3, 1986, the excavation was backfilled.

Demolition and replacement

The City and County of San Francisco, the Alameda – Contra Costa Transit District (AC Transit), and the Peninsula Corridor Joint Powers Board (Caltrain) proposed to replace the underused original Transbay Terminal with an entirely new and more functional building at roughly the same location.  The final Environmental Impact Report (EIR) was published in 2004, and construction began in August 2010 on Phase 1, the new Transbay Transit Center (TTC) building.  A new outdoor temporary terminal was opened nearby to serve commuters during construction of the new transit center.

It was announced in March 2011 that a sculpture to be assembled from Transbay Terminal debris by Tim Hawkinson would be erected on the corner of Mission and Fremont Streets after completion of the new Transbay Transit Center. However, the sculpture project was cancelled on June 7, 2017 due to cost and engineering concerns.

Temporary Transbay Terminal

The Temporary Transbay Terminal was the San Francisco terminus for Transbay and regional buses for most of the 2010s. It was in operation from August 2010 through August 2018, when the new Transbay Transit Center opened, and again from September 2018 to August 2019 during a temporary closure of the new center.  It occupied the city block bounded by Howard, Main, Folsom, and Beale Streets.

Closure & reopening 
The Temporary Transbay Terminal initially ceased operations on August 12, 2018, with the opening of the new Salesforce Transit Center, only to be reopened weeks later, on September 25, 2018, following the discovery of support beam cracks at the Salesforce Transit Center. By December 5, 2018, Clipper card kiosks were reinstalled at the temporary terminal due to the continued closure of the Transit Center.
In April 2019, repairs were finished and it was determined that the cause of the cracking was partly caused when crews welding the beams together skipped a crucial step in the process required by the building code that led to tiny, micro-cracks forming. Multiple inspections failed to notice the skipped step, and those micro-cracks grew into larger ones. After a thorough set of repairs and reviews, the transit center reopened to the public on August 11, 2019, nearly one year after its closure.

Future development 
In 2018, real estate developers submitted proposals to demolish the Temporary Terminal and replace it with affordable housing and a park, but with the permanent transit center still closed for repairs at that time, the future of that proposed project was not known.

See also

 California High-Speed Rail
 Ferry Building
 Key System
 List of tallest buildings in San Francisco
 Transbay Transit Center
 San Francisco Transbay development
 Transbay Tube

Bibliography
Earth Metrics Inc, ‘'Environmental Site Assessment, Assessors Block 3747, San Francisco'‘, File 7825W0.001, 25 April 1989

References

External links
 
 Transbay Temporary Terminal website The temporary transbay terminal, operated 2010-2018.
 Planning Department district planning project
 Site with information on Key System service to the transbay terminal
 New Transbay Transit Center
 Photo: Key System Train Inside Transbay Terminal
 Transit Unlimited - Transbay Terminal transit information
 Key System train on ramp to Bay Bridge, 1939, Dorothea Lange photo
  
 

Bus stations in San Francisco
Demolished buildings and structures in San Francisco
South of Market, San Francisco
Former San Francisco Municipal Railway stations
Transit centers in the United States
Proposed public transportation in the San Francisco Bay Area
Art Deco architecture in California
1939 establishments in California
2010 disestablishments in California
Former railway stations in California
Former bus stations
Railway stations in the United States opened in 1939
Railway stations closed in 1982
Railway stations in the United States opened in 1995
Railway stations closed in 2000
Buildings and structures demolished in 2010
Demolished railway stations in the United States